is a Japanese table tennis player who plays a defensive, chopping style.

Ishigaki has won singles titles at the 2010 Egypt Open and the 2016 Bulgaria Open, and a women's doubles crown at the 2010 Japan Open.

References

1989 births
Japanese female table tennis players
Living people
Sportspeople from Nagoya
Shukutoku University alumni
Universiade medalists in table tennis
Universiade gold medalists for Japan
Universiade silver medalists for Japan
Universiade bronze medalists for Japan
Medalists at the 2009 Summer Universiade
Medalists at the 2011 Summer Universiade
Medalists at the 2013 Summer Universiade
21st-century Japanese women